Rodrigo Balart is an Australian film editor, best known for Restraint, Road Train & Black Water, the latter of which he was nominated for Best Editing at the 2007 AFI Awards. He was also nominated for the ASE Award for editing the telemovie Hawke. He won the 2017 AACTA Award for Best Editing in Television for Seven Types of Ambiguity, Episode 1 (Joe).

Filmography

References

External links

Living people
1974 births
Australian film editors
People from Valparaíso